Yeh Feng (born 19 October 1937), also known as Julie Yeh Feng, is an actress, singer and businesswoman. She starred in various films throughout the 1950s and 1960s, and is considered to have been one of Hong Kong's biggest stars of the period.

Biography
Yeh was born as Wang Jiuling in Hankou, Hubei, Republic of China. Yeh's family moved to Taiwan in 1948. She was cast in a 1954 film in Taiwan that never reached production, after which the directors Li Han-hsiang and Li Zuyong recommended her and she was signed to Motion Pictures and General Investment (MP&GI). Yeh made her screen debut in 1957 in the musical Our Sister Hedy, which tells the story of four sisters and their sibling rivalries.

Yeh left MP&GI in 1962, after which she signed with the Shaw Brothers Studio, one of the largest production companies in Hong Kong. She retired in 1969, but made a cameo in frequent co-star Lin Cui's 1975 comedy. Yeh currently works as a businesswoman.

Personal life
In 1961, Yeh married Chang Yang, an actor. In 1965, Yeh divorced from Chang Yang. Later Yeh married another actor Ling Yun, but Yeh divorced again in 1983.

Filmography

Films

References

External links

Julie Yeh Feng at brns.com

1937 births
Living people
20th-century Chinese women singers
20th-century Hong Kong actresses
21st-century Chinese businesswomen
21st-century Chinese businesspeople
Actresses from Hubei
Businesspeople from Hubei
20th-century Hong Kong women singers
Hong Kong film actresses
Hong Kong Mandopop singers
Singers from Hubei
Taiwanese emigrants to Hong Kong
Taiwanese people from Hubei
Pathé Records (Hong Kong) artists
Shaw Brothers Studio